The water equivalent is calculated for the following:

 Meter water equivalent, a standard measure of cosmic ray attenuation in underground laboratories
 Snow water equivalent